Nephropexy is the surgical fixation of a floating or mobile kidney (nephroptosis).

It was first performed by Eugen Hahn on 10 April 1881.

References

Urologic surgery